Andrew Bulumakau (born 28 July 1992) is a Scottish Professional rugby union player who plays Coventry in the RFU Championship. He was born in Fiji but was raised up in Scotland. He previously competed for Gloucester Rugby where he was dual-registered with Cinderford He made a name for himself when he played in his first JP Morgan 7s in 2013 for Gloucester Rugby and helped them win their first ever JP Morgan 7s title in 2013.

After his release from Gloucester, Bulumakau signed for Doncaster Knights who compete in the RFU Championship from the 2014–15 season. On 12 April 2018, Bulumakau left Doncaster to join Championship rivals Coventry ahead of the 2018-19 season.

His brother Junior Bulumakau is a Scottish international Sevens player.

References

Living people
1992 births
Scottish rugby union players
Gloucester Rugby players
Place of birth missing (living people)
Sportspeople from Gloucestershire
Doncaster R.F.C. players
Rugby union centres